St. Barts may refer to:

Saint Barthélemy, an island in the French West Indies.

See also
Saint-Barthélemy (disambiguation)
St. Bartholomew's (disambiguation)